Haldimand—Norfolk is a provincial electoral district in southwestern Ontario, Canada. It was created for the 2007 provincial election. 88.0% of the riding came from Haldimand—Norfolk—Brant while 12.0% came from Erie—Lincoln.

The riding includes all of the counties of Haldimand and Norfolk except those parts of Haldimand found in the Six Nations and New Credit Indian Reserves.

The riding also existed from 1934 to 1987.

Members of Provincial Parliament

Election results

2007 electoral reform referendum

Sources
Elections Ontario Past Election Results
Map of riding for 2018 election

References 

Ontario provincial electoral districts
Haldimand County
Norfolk County, Ontario